The 2019–20 Texas Longhorns men's basketball team represent the University of Texas at Austin in the 2019–20 NCAA Division I men's basketball season. They were led by fifth-year head coach Shaka Smart and play their home games at the Frank Erwin Center in Austin, Texas as members of the Big 12 Conference.

Previous season
The Longhorns finished the 2018–19 season 21–16, 8–10 in Big 12 play play to finish in sixth place. They were defeated by Kansas in the first round of the Big 12 tournament. They received an at-large bid to the 2019 National Invitational Tournament as a No. 2 seed. They defeated South Dakota State in the first round, Xavier in the second round and Colorado in the quarterfinals to advance win the Alabama bracket. They advanced to Madison Square Garden where they defeated TCU in the semifinals and Lipscomb in the final to win the program's second-ever NIT Championship (the first was in 1978).

Offseason

Coaching changes

In April 2019, associate head coach Darrin Horn accepted the position of Northern Kentucky head basketball coach. Smart hired Luke Yaklich as Horn's replacement in May 2019.

Departures

2019 recruiting class

2020 Recruiting class

Roster

Schedule and results

|-
!colspan=9 style=|Regular season

|-
!colspan=9 style=|Big 12 Tournament
|- style="background:#bbbbbb"
| style="text-align:center"|Mar 12, 202011:30 am, ESPN2
| style="text-align:center"| (4)
| vs. (5) Texas TechQuarterfinals
| colspan=5 rowspan=1 style="text-align:center"|Cancelled due to the COVID-19 pandemic
| style="text-align:center"|Sprint CenterKansas City, MO

Rankings

*AP does not release post-NCAA Tournament rankings.

References

2019–20 Big 12 Conference men's basketball season
2019
2019 in sports in Texas
2020 in sports in Texas